The Baltimore Clippers were a minor league professional ice hockey team from in Baltimore, Maryland, playing in the Eastern Amateur Hockey League at Carlin's Iceland. The team began play in the 1944–45 season known as the Baltimore Blades, and were renamed the Clippers from 1946 to 1949. The team name paid homage to local history in the Baltimore Clipper, and the Port of Baltimore. The Clippers ceased operations during the 1949–50 season.

History
The Baltimore Blades were founded in 1944 by the Jacobs brothers, who owned a military uniform supply company. The Blades replaced the void in the EAHL when the United States Coast Guard Cutters hockey team disbanded. Baltimore was affiliated with the Buffalo Bisons in the American Hockey League. Eddie Shore coached the parent team, and was also the Blades' general manager. Former Bison player Leroy Goldsworthy coached the Blades to a second-place finish in the EAHL.

In the 1945–46 season, the team changed names to the Clippers, and the affiliation with Buffalo ended. Baltimore finished the season fourth in the EAHL, and went through three head coaches, including Jim Foley, Herb Mitchell, and player-coach Jack Riley. In the 1946–47 season, Hank Roy was named head coach, but was replaced with the returning Goldsworthy as Baltimore again finished fourth in the EAHL.

Frank Beisler was named the new head coach and manager for the 1947–48 season. Beisler led the team to 31 wins and finished first place in the league, winning the Walker Cup. Right winger Charlie Knox led the league with 54 goals, and 86 points; center Dave Maguire led the league with 53 assists, and defender Jack Nixon led the league with 182 penalty minutes in 37 games.

The EAHL did not operate for the 1948–49 season, but resumed play for the 1949–50 season. Kilby MacDonald was named the head coach and team manager. After twelve games, the Clippers had four wins, and withdrew from league play on December 4, 1949.

Players
Notable league executive Jack Riley played for the Clippers from 1945 to 1946. Two Blades players, and seven Clippers players also played in the National Hockey League. Notable players include:

Hugh Currie
Norm Dussault
Gordie Haworth
Gordon Henry
Rosario Joannette
Ray Powell
Jack Riley
Stan Smrke
Jack Stoddard
Chick Webster

Results
Season-by-season results.

References

Defunct ice hockey teams in the United States
Eastern Hockey League teams
Ice hockey teams in Maryland
Ice hockey clubs established in 1944
Ice hockey clubs disestablished in 1949
Sports teams in Baltimore
1944 establishments in Maryland
1949 disestablishments in Maryland